is a Japanese professional shogi player ranked 4-dan.

Early life
Takada was born in Kakamigahara, Gifu, Japan on June 20, 2002. He learned how to play shogi when he was third-grade elementary school student.

Shogi

Apprentice professional
Takada entered the Japan Shogi Association's apprentice school in September 2014 as a student of shogi professional . Takada was promoted to the rank of apprentice professional 3-dan in April 2020 and obtained full professional status and the rank of 4-dan after tying for first place in the 68th 3-dan League (October 2020March 2021) with a record of 13 wins and 5 losses.

Promotion history
The promotion history for Takada is as follows.
6-kyū: September 2014
3-dan: April 2020
4-dan: April 1, 2021

References

External links
 ShogiHub: Professional Player Info · Takada, Akihiro

Japanese shogi players
Living people
Professional shogi players
Professional shogi players from Gifu Prefecture
2002 births